Rising Sun is an alternate history novel written by Robert Conroy. It was published by Baen Books as a hardcover book on December 4, 2012 and then was released online as an ebook 11 days later on December 15, 2012 before being published as a paperback book on October 29, 2013.

Plot
In World War II during the summer of 1942, the Battle of Midway is won by the Japan. Two of the United States' handful of carriers in the Pacific were blundered into a Japanese submarine picket line and were sunk, while a third is destroyed the next day. The United States Navy now only has one carrier remaining in the Pacific against nine Japanese ones, while the ragtag remnants of U.S. battleships – an armada still reeling from the defeat at Pearl Harbor in the December of the previous year – are in even worse shape.

Japan now has control of nearly the entire Pacific Ocean. Soon afterwards, Japan invades Alaska while Hawaii gets put under blockade. The Panama Canal is soon clogged with traffic while towns and cities on the West Coast of America are subjected to bombing raids.

Despite these disasters, the U.S. begins to fight back against the Japanese. Limited counterattacks by the Americans are made and a grand plan is put forth to lure the Japanese into an ambush that could restore the balance in the Pacific and give the American forces a fair fighting chance.

Reception
Booklist called it "thrilling", and noted that "familiarity with actual events is a bonus but not a requirement".

References

2012 American novels
American alternate history novels
Novels by Robert Conroy
Novels about World War II alternate histories
Baen Books books